The 2016 Independence Cup also known as KFC Independence Cup due to the sponsorship from KFC is the 7th edition of the tournament. A total of 12 teams completing in this tournament. Dhaka Mohammedan was the winner of previous edition of the tournament.

Venues

Group stage
The twelve participants were divided into two groups. The top two teams for each group qualified for the semifinals.

Group A

Group B

Knockout stage

Semi Final 1

Semi Final 2

Final

Goal scorers
Top 5

References

Independence Cup (Bangladesh)
2016 in Bangladeshi football
2016 domestic association football cups